1/6 or  may refer to:
1/6 (number), a fraction (one sixth)
1/6 (EP), a 2021 EP by Sunmi
1st Battalion, 6th Marines
January 6 (month-day date notation)
The United States Capitol attack, which occurred on January 6, 2021
1 June (day-month date notation)

See also
 6/1 (disambiguation)
 One & Six, album by Apink
 One Six Right, documentary film
 Ones and Sixes, album by Low
 Schweizer SGU 1-6
 Six of One (disambiguation)
 Sixth (disambiguation)